Stanislas Branicki (born 9 April 2002) is a French field hockey player.

Personal life
Stanislas Branicki has an older brother, Maximilien, who also plays international hockey for France.

Career

Club level
In club competition, Branicki plays for Royal Orée in the Belgian Hockey League.

Junior national team
Stanislas Branicki made his debut for the French U–21 team in 2021 at the FIH Junior World Cup in Bhubaneswar.  At the tournament he won a bronze medal.

Les Bleus
Branicki made his debut for Les Bleus in 2021 during a test match against Belgium in Antwerp. Later that year he was also named in the French squad for the season three of the FIH Pro League.

References

External links

2002 births
Living people
French male field hockey players
Male field hockey defenders
Place of birth missing (living people)
2023 Men's FIH Hockey World Cup players